ISO 657 (Hot-rolled steel sections) is an ISO standard that specifies the tolerances for hot-finished circular, square and rectangular structural hollow sections and gives the dimensions and sectional properties for a range of standard sizes.

This first edition as an International Standard constitutes a technical revision of ISO Recommendation R 657-1:1968. ISO 657 consists of 21 parts integrating any shapes of sections. ISO 657-1 specifies dimensions of hot-rolled equal-leg angles.

Amendments
ISO 657-2:1989
ISO 657-5:1976
ISO 657-11:1980
ISO 657-14:2000
Revisions
ISO/DIS 12633-2
ISO 657-14:1982
ISO 657-15:1980
ISO 657-16:1980
ISO 657-18:1980
ISO 657-19:1980
ISO 657-21:1983

References
 ISO Catalogue in the ISO website

00657